We Who Are Young is a 1940 American drama film directed by Harold S. Bucquet, written by Dalton Trumbo and starring Lana Turner, John Shelton and Gene Lockhart.

Plot

Cast
 Lana Turner as Margy Brooks
 John Shelton as William Brooks
 Gene Lockhart as C. B. Beamis
 Grant Mitchell as Jones
 Henry Armetta as Tony
 Jonathan Hale as Braddock
 Clarence Wilson as R. Glassford
 Ian Wolfe as Judge
 Hal K. Dawson as Salesman
 John Butler as Mr. Peabody
 Irene Seidner as Mrs. Weinstock
 Charles Lane as Perkins
 Horace McMahon as Foreman

Box office
According to MGM records, the film earned $297,000 in the U.S. and Canada and $136,000 elsewhere, resulting in a loss of $103,000.

References

External links
 
 

1940 films
1940 romantic drama films
American romantic drama films
American black-and-white films
Films directed by Harold S. Bucquet
Films set in New York City
Metro-Goldwyn-Mayer films
Films with screenplays by Dalton Trumbo
Films produced by Seymour Nebenzal
Films scored by Bronisław Kaper
1940s English-language films
1940s American films